Paonias astylus, the huckleberry sphinx, is a moth in the family Sphingidae. The species was first described by Dru Drury in 1773.

Distribution 
It is found in eastern North America, from Maine south to Florida, west to Missouri and Mississippi.

Description 
The wingspan is 55–65 mm. Adults are on wing from March to June and again in September in two generations in Florida. There is one generation with adults on wing in July in the northern part of its range.

Biology 
The larvae feed on blueberry, Vaccinium (including V. vacillans and V. corymbosum), Prunus, Andromeda and Salix. Adults do not feed.

References

External links

"Paonias astylus (Drury, 1773)". Sphingidae of the Americas. Retrieved December 19, 2018.

Paonias
Moths described in 1773
Taxa named by Dru Drury
Moths of North America